
Year 902 (CMII) was a common year starting on Friday (link will display the full calendar) of the Julian calendar.

Events 
 By place 

 Europe 
 Spring – Adalbert II, margrave of Tuscany, revolts against Emperor Louis III ("the Blind"). He helps the deposed King Berengar I to recover the Kingdom of Italy. Louis III is forced to abdicate the Lombard throne and flees to Provence, compelled to promise never to return to Italy.
 February – March – Abu Abbas Abdallah, conqueror of Reggio Calabria, returns from Sicily and succeeds his father Ibrahim II as Aghlabid emir of Ifriqiya.
 June – Ibrahim II lands with an Aghlabid expeditionary force in Trapani, and proceeds to Palermo. He crushes the reinforced Byzantine army at Giardini.
 August 1 – Taormina, the last Byzantine stronghold in Sicily, is captured by the Aghlabid army. After nearly 75 years, all of Sicily is in Aghlabid hands.
 September – Ibrahim II crosses the Strait of Messina into Calabria. He begins his march to conquer the rest of Italy, and lays siege at Cosenza.
 October 23 – Ibrahim II dies of dysentery in a chapel near Cosenza. His grandson, Ziyadat Allah, takes over the army, but lifts the siege.
 Winter – The Balearic Islands are conquered by the Emirate of Córdoba. The Moors improve agriculture with irrigation on the islands.

 Britain 
 December 13 – Battle of the Holme: The Anglo-Saxon army is defeated by the Danish Vikings under Æthelwold (a son of Æthelred I) at Holme. Æthelwold is killed, ending his revolt against King Edward the Elder. 
 Winter – The Norsemen are expelled from Dublin. After a brief foray into Seisyllwg (Wales), a group, under the Viking lord Ingimundr, settle in the Wirral with the agreement of Lady Æthelflæd of the Mercians.

 Arabian Empire 
 April 5 – Caliph Al-Mu'tadid dies in Baghdad after a 10-year reign. Possibly poisoned in a palace intrigue, he is succeeded by his eldest son Al-Muktafi as ruler of the Abbasid Caliphate.
 The Kutama tribe under Abu Abdallah al-Shi'i revolt against the Aghlabids. He begins a campaign and dispatches an invitation to the Fatimid spiritual leader Ubayd Allah al-Mahdi Billah to support him.
 Moorish Andalusian merchants set up a trade settlement (so-called emporium) in Oran (modern Algeria).

 Asia 
 Spring – Emperor Zhao Zong appoints Yang Xingmi as the overall commander of the Eastern circuits in China. He receives the title of Prince Wuzhong of Wu.
 The Kingdom of Nanzhao in East Asia is overthrown, followed by three dynasties in quick succession, before the establishment of the Kingdom of Dali in 937.

Births 
 November 25 – Tai Zong, emperor of the Liao Dynasty (d. 947)
 Ælfweard, king of Wessex (approximate date)
 Du, empress of the Song Dynasty (approximate date)
 Eadgifu, queen and wife of Charles the Simple
 Han Xizai, Chinese official and calligrapher (d. 970)
 Lady Xu Xinyue, wife of Qian Yuanguan (d. 946)
 Lothar I, Frankish nobleman (d. 929)
 Wang Jun, chancellor of Later Zhou (or 903)

Deaths 
 February 16 – Mary the Younger, Byzantine saint (b. 875)
 April 5 – Al-Mu'tadid, Abbasid caliph
 August 14 – Badr al-Mu'tadidi, Abbasid commander-in-chief 
 October 23 – Ibrahim II, Aghlabid emir (b. 850)
 December 5 – Ealhswith, queen and wife of Alfred the Great
 December 16 – Wei Yifan, chancellor of the Tang Dynasty
 Æthelwold, son of Æthelred of Wessex
 Amr ibn al-Layth, Saffarid emir
 Anscar I, margrave of Ivrea (Italy)
 Li Cunxin, general of the Tang Dynasty (b. 862)
 Wang Zongdi, Chinese official and governor
 Yunju Daoying, Chinese Buddhist teacher (b. 830)

References